Erlistoun Station is a pastoral lease that has operated as a cattle station and more recently as a sheep station in Western Australia.

Borodale Creek runs through the property from Davis Pool on the northern boundary meandering through waterholes to Namendarra Lake on the southern boundary.

Erlistoun was known as a district in the area before the station was established. The company was initially running cattle at Erlistoun, 1,000 head of which they had overlanded down from the Kimberley.

The Emanuel brothers owned the property in 1911 when it was sold to Kalgoorlie-Boulder Firewood Company. In 1924 the property was estimated to be carrying 5,500 head of cattle. By 1925 the size of the property was estimated as being  and was stocked with 4,000 head of cattle. Sheep had been introduced to the property by this time and in 1926 it was stocked with 7,000 cattle and 5,000 sheep. Shearing the same year yielded 31 bales of wool per 1,000 sheep. Another 4,000 sheep were due to arrive at the station in late 1926.
 
Erlistoun was the initial location of the first feature-length film shot in Western Australia; scenes for the film Down Under, directed by Harry Southwell, were shot at the station in 1926.

The normally dry creek ran for a length of over  through the property. In 1930, the property was running a flock of 13,000 sheep. In the same year the Kalgoorlie-Boulder Firewood company changed its name to the Erlistoun Pastoral Company; the directors were Alex Porter, J. McCalmont and E.H. Jolly.

In 2003 the property was being plagued by wild dogs attacking the sheep. Other properties in the area were similarly affected.

The area is popular amongst gold prospectors. Guest accommodation is available on Erlistoun in the shearers' quarters.

See also
List of ranches and stations
List of pastoral leases in Western Australia

References

Homesteads in Western Australia
Pastoral leases in Western Australia
Stations (Australian agriculture)
Goldfields-Esperance